Hypocritical Oaf is the third album by comedian Doug Benson, released by Comedy Central Records as a CD/DVD.

Track listing

CD
"Deets" – 4:36
"Peanut Lady" – 2:44
"The Track with the Stupid Fart Joke" – 5:22
"Breakfast Window" – 3:30
"Time to Go Fred Travalena On Your Asses" – 2:51
"Weak Back Problems" – 4:04
"Pot the Vote" – 2:55
"Sitting There In Your Own Filth" – 3:52
"Booty / Weedy Text" – 5:15
"Follow Me" – 2:56
"Too Trunk to Dweet" – 1:58
"Big Finish" – 9:42

DVD
"Comedy Central Presents" (2004)
"Comedy Central Presents" (2009)

Reception

Hypocritical Oaf received positive reviews, mostly praised by fans. Allmusic wrote, "the comedian is highly skilled and can work a lot of sex talk and fart jokes into these topics, as if he was a rambling, baked comedy ninja being cheered on by an equally baked audience.

Chart positions

References

2010 live albums
Comedy Central Records live albums
Stand-up comedy albums
2010s comedy albums
2010s spoken word albums
Spoken word albums by American artists
Live spoken word albums
Doug Benson albums